The 2017–18 Chattanooga Mocs basketball team represented the University of Tennessee at Chattanooga during the 2017–18 NCAA Division I men's basketball season. The Mocs, led by first-year head coach Lamont Paris, played their home games at McKenzie Arena and as members of the Southern Conference. They finished the season 10–23, 3–15 in SoCon play to finish in last place. They defeated Samford in the first round of the SoCon tournament to advance to the quarterfinals where they lost to East Tennessee State.

Previous season
The Mocs finished the 2016–17 season 19–12, 10–8 in SoCon play to finish for fourth place. In the SoCon tournament, they lost to Wofford in the quarterfinals.

On March 29, 2017, head coach Matt McCall left the program to take the head coaching job at UMass. On April 3, the Mocs hired Wisconsin assistant Lamont Paris as the new head coach.

Roster

Schedule and results

|-
!colspan=9 style=| Non-conference regular season

|-
!colspan=9 style=| SoCon regular season

|-
!colspan=9 style=| SoCon tournament

See also
 2017-18 Chattanooga Mocs women's basketball

References

Chattanooga Mocs men's basketball seasons
Chattanooga
Chattanooga Mocs
Chattanooga Mocs